The Wind Journeys is a 2009 Colombian-German-Argentine-Dutch drama film written and directed by Ciro Guerra. It was filmed in 80 locations in Northern Colombia and is spoken in Spanish, Palenquero, Wayuunaiki, and Ikun. It was selected as the Colombian entry for the Best Foreign Language Film at the 82nd Academy Awards, but was not nominated.

Plot
The film follows the travels of vallenato musician Ignacio Carrillo (portrayed by real-life musician Marciano Martínez) who is followed by Fermín, a young boy who wants to be his apprentice, in a journey to return his instrument to his original owner, the man who once was his mentor.

Ignacio Carrillo is a vallenato musician from Majagual (Sucre), who decides, after his wife's sudden death, to stop playing and return his accordion to his former master. It is said that the instrument is cursed after Guerra, the former master, won a duel with the devil. He is joined by Fermín Morales (Yull Núñez), a teenage boy who admires Ignacio and wishes to become a juglar like him. Carrillo reluctantly accepts, given his loneliness. In 1968, on an Ash Wednesday, Carrillo, Morales and their donkey start a journey throughout several towns in the Caribbean region in Northern Colombia, to Taroa (a small caserío in La Guajira Desert, where Carrillo's master supposedly lives. During their journey, Carrillo participates in the first version of the Vallenato Legend Festival in Valledupar.

Cast
 Marciano Martínez as Ignacio Carrillo
 Yull Núñez as Fermín Morales
 Agustín Nieves as Ninz
 José Luis Torres as Meyo

Production 
Guerra had the idea to make the film after an introduction meeting for students when he began to study films in the National University of Colombia. "A boy stood up and said: My name is John Doe, I'm x years old and I hate the vallenato. And people applauded him.". He decided then to demonstrate that the vallenato is more than "commercial music that is heard in the buses of the cities and that generates prevention in people".

Guerra sees vallenato as an important cultural component pointing out "If there is the American imaginary of the western and the Chinese imaginary of the fantastic genre of martial arts, here is one very rich in vallenato".

The protagonists of the film had no experience as actors before the production, so they received a year of preparation for the making of the film. According to Guerra, it was easy to find people willing to participate in the production, with the exception of the Arawak of the Sierra Nevada de Santa Marta, who were a more reserved community so it took a year's effort to persuade them.

It was filmed in 80 locations in Northern Colombia and is spoken in Spanish, Palenquero, Wayuunaiki, and Ikun.

Release
The film was released on 30 April 2009 as part of the Vallenato Legend Festival.

Reception

Critical response
The film received positive reviews from critics. Justin Chang of Variety gave a positive review of the film. He summarized his review saying: "The rugged majesty of the Colombian landscape forms a spectacular widescreen backdrop for a simple, bittersweet tale of regret and companionship in "The Wind Journeys." David Sterritt of TCM wrote: "Extremely high praise is due to the widescreen color cinematography by Paulo Andrés Pérez, which captures a sweeping array of locations... in images brimming with atmosphere." He also praised the music by Iván Ocampo, saying that his "... original score is also crucial to the movie's effectiveness". As noted by Ana Cecilia Calle in her review for Austin Film Society, the film makes references to the legendary figure of Francisco the Man, of whom it is said beat the devil in a contest and is mentioned in Gabriel García Márquez's One Hundred Years of Solitude. She also wrote: "The film sharply points out ways music connected people and territories in rural northern Colombia in the late 1960s... The film's quest of returning the accordion is an homage to such communities..." Like others, she praised the cinematography saying: "Guerra's careful cinematography offers both a tempting dish and also a challenge for the audience: panoramic shots, long silences, short dialogues, crisp, wide ambient sound. These elements allow us to lose ourselves in a sensorial experience that can also question our traditional cinematic ideas about time."

Awards
The Wind Journeys was chosen to participate in the Un Certain Regard section at the 2009 Cannes Film Festival. There it won the Award of the City of Rome.

The film also won the awards of Best Colombian Film and Best Director at 2009 Bogotá Film Festival and Best Colombian Film and Best Director at 2010 Cartagena Film Festival. The film won the Best Spanish Language Film award at 2010 Santa Barbara International Film Festival.

See also
List of submissions to the 82nd Academy Awards for Best Foreign Language Film
List of Colombian submissions for the Academy Award for Best Foreign Language Film

References

External links
 

 
 Los viajes del viento at Proimágenes Colombia

2009 films
2000s road movies
Colombian drama films
Argentine drama films
German drama films
Dutch drama films
2000s Spanish-language films
Wayuu-language films
Films set in Colombia
Films shot in Colombia
Films directed by Ciro Guerra
Indigenous cinema in Latin America
Palenquero-language films
Cockfighting in film
2000s German films
2000s Argentine films